Kenneth George Elliott (3 March 1922 – 19 February 2006) was an All Blacks rugby union player from New Zealand.  He was a Lock and No 8.

He played 2 matches for the All Blacks in 1946 against Australia, scoring 6 points (2 tries).

He was born in Wellington and educated at Wellington College.

He served in the Army (2NZEF) in World War II, playing in services teams. Postwar he played in several provincial sides; Wellington, Manawatu and Waikato.

References

The Encyclopaedia of New Zealand Rugby by Ron Palenski, Rod Chester & Neville McMillan, page 67 (4th edition 2005, Hodder Moa Beckett, Auckland) 

1922 births
2006 deaths
Rugby union players from Wellington City
People educated at Wellington College (New Zealand)
New Zealand rugby union players
New Zealand international rugby union players
Wellington rugby union players
Rugby union locks
New Zealand military personnel of World War II